Thambi is a 2006 Indian Tamil-language action film written and directed by Seeman. The film stars Madhavan and Pooja, while Vadivelu, Manivannan and Biju Menon play other supporting roles. Featuring music composed by Vidyasagar and cinematography by Balasubramaniem, the film released on 22 February 2006 and became successful in box office. This Movie Was Dubbed In Hindi As My Dear Munna Bhai And It was distributed by Shemaroo Entertainment.

Plot

Thambi Velu Thondaiman (Madhavan) is a rebellious youth who cannot tolerate violence and injustice by any means. His main target is Sankara Pandian (Biju Menon), a rich local goon. Thambi wants Sankara Pandian to leave all his illegal activities and violence. One day Thambi interrupts Archana's (Pooja) stage performance when chasing a wrongdoer. Archana misunderstands Thambi as a rowdy and hates him, but Thambi saves Archana in a restaurant when a few guys try molesting her, following which she starts liking him, which gradually transforms into love. However, Thambi does not reciprocate and wants Archana to stop following him as he has so many enemies in the city.

Thambi is invited to his alma mater to preside for a function where he opens up his personal story. A flashback is shown where Thambi was leading a joyful life with his parents and sister. Once, Thambi spots a murder committed by Saravana Pandian (Shanmugarajan), Sankara Pandian's brother. Thambi becomes the murder witness and identifies the murderer in court, which angers Sankara Pandian. To avenge his brother's arrest, Sankara Pandian murders Thambi's parents and sister. This made Thambi transform into a fearless youth trying to make the city free from violence.

Thambi wants Sankara Pandian to transform into a good guy and prevents all his plans to erupt violence in the city. Finally, Sankara Pandian brings in violence and clashes in the city one day for political reasons. Unfortunately, his mother suddenly suffers a from heart attack, and he rushes to the hospital with her. On the way, however, his car gets blocked in traffic as there is violence everywhere on the roads, and he could not reach the hospital on time. Thambi comes to the spot, and Sankara Pandian thinks that Thambi will take revenge on him by killing his family. However, to his surprise, Thambi lifts Sankara Pandian's mother from the car and runs to the hospital. Sankara Pandian's mother is saved, following which Sankara Pandian realizes his mistake and admires Thambi's great affection for the well-being of every person although not related to him. He also decides to leave all his violence and illegal activities and apologizes to Thambi for his wrongful acts committed. In the end, Thambi and Archana unite.

Cast

Madhavan as Thambi Velu Thondaiman aka Velu
Pooja as Archana
Vadivelu as Natarasu
Biju Menon as Sankara Pandiyan
Manivannan as Podhuvudamai
Vagai Chandrasekhar
Shanmugarajan as Saravana Pandiyan
Ilavarasu as Sankaraiyan
Raj Kapoor as Police
Manobala as Sankaraiyan's assistant
Vinod Raj
Ragasudha
Sumithra
Karate Raja
Sashikumar Subramani
Thillai Rajan

Production
Director Seeman made a comeback to film direction after taking a sabbatical following the release of Veeranadai in 1999 and began working on a script about a village-based vigilante to be produced by Mid Valley Entertainments. Madhavan heard the script of the film at the insistence of his manager, Nazir, and was impressed with the "fire and confidence" in Seeman's narration. He subsequently signed on to work on the film in October 2004. The actor subsequently underwent a makeover for the film, sporting long hair and portrayed a young man from a village for the first time in his career. The team initially approached Asin for the lead female role, before finalising debutant Simran from Bombay. However, the team wanted to go for an actress with lesser remuneration and Pooja was eventually signed on to work on the film during December 2004 and collaborated with Madhavan for the second time after Jay Jay (2003).

The film was shot across South Tamil Nadu, with shoots extensively filmed in Karaikudi. Madhavan left the shoot of the film in August 2005 to attend the birth of his child in Mumbai. His sudden disappearance led to the Producers' Guild giving him a ban, before the matter was amicably sorted. The film was completed during November 2005 and the team began post-production works thereafter. Dubbing works were completed at Bharani Studios in Chennai later that month.

Soundtrack

Soundtrack was composed by Vidyasagar.

Release
The film opened to mixed reviews but performed well at the box office. A critic from Sify.com stated "Seeman's intentions are noble but could have been told in a more realistic manner". Indiaglitz.com stated "Seeman has succeeded in rendering a movie carrying a message that fits the contemporary society" and that it is "a bold attempt worth watching". The critic added "however, on the flip side, towards the second-half, few romantic sequences scenes involving Pooja and Madhavan puts brakes on the movie's pace". A critic from galatta.com stated "Thambi is, all in all, a good film".

References

External links
 

2006 films
2000s Tamil-language films
Films scored by Vidyasagar
Indian vigilante films
Films directed by Seeman